State Route 123 (SR 123) is a state highway in southwestern Ohio. The section of road from Franklin to Lebanon was originally a toll road until it was taken over by Warren County and made free for public use.

Landmarks
Ohio Historical Marker #2-14 is located on State Route 123 near Blanchester. It commemorates the Garrison Corner Community which was settled by Lemuel Garrison, Sr., and included a school and cemetery.

History
In Lebanon, SR 123 was rerouted to a new roadway, which the city of Lebanon has called "Neil Armstrong Way", from SR 63's (Main Street) intersection with Glosser Road to SR 123's existing intersection with Hart Road. Armstrong for many years owned a farm along SR 123 between Lebanon and the community of Red Lion. The road opened on October 7, 2014. There are also plans to introduce a bill in the state senate to apply the name "Neil Armstrong Way" to the entire stretch of SR 123 from Lebanon to Red Lion.

Major intersections

References

External links

123
Transportation in Brown County, Ohio
Transportation in Clinton County, Ohio
Transportation in Warren County, Ohio
Transportation in Montgomery County, Ohio